Arnold Louis Weinstein (born July 8, 1940) is an American literary scholar. He is currently Edna and Richard Salomon Distinguished Professor of Comparative Literature at Brown University.

Weinstein was born in Memphis, Tennessee. After earning a B.A. in Romance Languages Princeton University in 1962, he enrolled at Harvard University, where he received both an M.A. (1964) and a Ph.D. (1968) in Comparative Literature. He studied in Europe during his undergraduate and graduate years, spending time at Universite de Paris, Freie Universitat Berlin, and Universite de Lyon.

He joined the faculty at Brown University in 1968, and was promoted to full professor a decade later. In 2007, he delivered the keynote address, titled "Reading Proust, Tracking Bears, at Brown," at the Opening Convocation of the university's 244th year.

Weinstein is the author of numerous articles and eight books. In 2009, The Atlantic'''s literary editor Benjamin Schwarz named Weinstein's study of Scandinavian modernism, Northern Arts: The Breakthrough of Scandinavian Literature and Art, from Ibsen to Bergman, one of the 25 best books of the year.

 Books 
 Vision and Response in Modern Fiction. Ithaca, NY: Cornell University Press, 1974.
 Fictions of the Self: 1550-1800. Princeton, NJ: Princeton University Press, 1981.
 The Fiction of Relationship. Princeton, NJ: Princeton University Press, 1988.
 Nobody's Home: Speech, Self and Place in American Fiction from Hawthorne to DeLillo. 1993.
 A Scream Goes Through the House: What Literature Teaches Us About Life. New York, Random House, 2003.
 Recovering Your Story: Proust, Joyce, Woolf, Faulkner, Morrison. New York: Random House, 2006.
 Northern Arts: The Breakthrough of Scandinavian Literature and Art, from Ibsen to Bergman. Princeton, NJ: Princeton University Press, 2008.
 Morning, Noon, and Night: Finding the Meaning of Life's Stages Through Books''. New York: Random House, 2011.

References 

Literary scholars
People from Memphis, Tennessee
Princeton University alumni
Harvard Graduate School of Arts and Sciences alumni
Brown University faculty
1940 births
Living people